Alejandro Ariel Montecchia (born 1972) is a retired Argentine-Italian professional basketball player. He played at the point guard position.

Professional career
In his pro career, Montecchia won the South American League and Argentine League championships in 1996. He also won the European-wide 2nd-tier level  EuroCup championship in the 2002–03 season. He was the South American League's MVP in 2008.

National team career
Montecchia was a regular on Argentina's senior national team, with which he won a gold medal at the 2004 Summer Olympic Games.

References

External links 
Euroleague.net Profile
LatinBasket.com Profile
Italian League Profile 
Spanish League Profile 

1972 births
Living people
1998 FIBA World Championship players
2002 FIBA World Championship players
Argentine expatriate basketball people in Italy
Argentine expatriate basketball people in Spain
Argentine men's basketball players
Argentine people of Italian descent
Basketball players at the 2004 Summer Olympics
Boca Juniors basketball players
Italian expatriate basketball people in Spain
Italian men's basketball players
Liga ACB players
Medalists at the 2004 Summer Olympics
Olimpia de Venado Tuerto basketball players
Olimpia Milano players
Olympic basketball players of Argentina
Olympic gold medalists for Argentina
Olympic medalists in basketball
Point guards
Regatas Corrientes basketball players
Valencia Basket players
Viola Reggio Calabria players
Sportspeople from Bahía Blanca